Gurli Ewerlund (13 October 1902 – 10 June 1985) was a Swedish freestyle swimmer who won a bronze medal in 4×100 m freestyle relay at the 1924 Summer Olympics, along with Aina Berg, Wivan Pettersson and Hjördis Töpel. She also competed in the individual 100 m and 400 m events, but failed to reach the finals.

References

1902 births
1985 deaths
Olympic swimmers of Sweden
Swimmers at the 1924 Summer Olympics
Olympic bronze medalists for Sweden
Olympic bronze medalists in swimming
Swedish female freestyle swimmers
SK Ran swimmers
Medalists at the 1924 Summer Olympics
Sportspeople from Malmö
20th-century Swedish women